Hyde and Hare is a 1955 Warner Bros. Looney Tunes cartoon, directed by Friz Freleng.  The short was released on August 27, 1955, and stars Bugs Bunny. The short is based on Robert Louis Stevenson's 1886 novella Strange Case of Dr Jekyll and Mr Hyde. The cartoon pits Bugs against Dr. Jekyll, who continues to turn into Mr. Hyde. The title is a play on the expression "neither hide nor hair."

Plot
Bugs comes out of his rabbit hole in a city park every morning because a kind gentleman keeps coming to feed him a carrot ("Well, here I go again with the 'timid little rabbit' routine. It's shameful, but - eh, it's a living!"). At first feigning the on-all-fours posture of a real rabbit, Bugs eventually stands up and confides that he would rather simply go home with the gentleman as a "pet", since it would be easier for both of them. As the gentleman brings Bugs home, he remarks that it is strange that Bugs calls him "Doc" because, "I happen to be a doctor." The camera then pans up to show that the name above the apartment is none other than Dr. Jekyll.

Inside the house, Bugs gets used to his new surroundings. Going into a room with a door marked "laboratory" in search of a carrot for Bugs, Dr. Jekyll walks by and sees the fizzing, red potion that he knows he should not drink, because it's a failing of his concoction, so he walks away, refuses to drink it, and tries to stay away from it, but gives in, and drinks the potion anyway ("Oh, I'm so ashamed!!"). He then transforms into Mr. Hyde, with a monstrous green face and glowing red eyes. When Bugs sees him, he initially thinks he is a sick person who needs to see the doctor, he sits Hyde in a chair, but as he goes to get the doctor, stops when Hyde swings an axe at Bugs, chopping a lamp in half. Bugs quickly realizes that this cackling, knuckle-dragging, axe-swinging monster is not someone to be heckled. Bugs runs away, calling out for the doctor. Soon the monster reverts to Dr. Jekyll. Bugs, still thinking that Hyde might benefit from seeing a doctor, tries leading Jekyll to the patient. On the way, the doctor changes into Hyde. After yelling for Jekyll again, then seeing that suddenly Hyde is gone since the doctor is back, Bugs decides they should hide in a storage room by giving Dr. Jekyll a shotgun, much to Jekyll's horror as he knows what will happen upon transformation ("Oh my, I wish he hadn't given me this... Oh dear, here it goes again!") As Dr. Jekyll feared, he transforms into Mr. Hyde yet again and tries to shoot Bugs, who, having reinforced the door, tears it open and escapes. Bugs heads for a closet and, seeing the doctor in the hallway, waves him inside and shuts the door. In the dark, another change occurs, and when seeing this again, Bugs flees, running into the laboratory.

At this point, once he is the doctor again, Jekyll decides that he's going to pour the rest of the formula down the drain since Bugs will never be bothered by that beast if he promises to stay. He goes into his laboratory, but finds the beaker empty. He asks Bugs if he drank the potion; much to his shock, Bugs acts insulted at the idea and leaves ("I am going back to the park! There is no question of my integrity there.....").

Walking back to his park, Bugs transforms into a monstrous green rabbit, confirming Jekyll's suspicion that Bugs did drink the potion. The people at the park who are busy feeding the pigeons see the transformed Bugs and run away screaming. Bugs (who, unlike Dr. Jekyll, retained his usual personality and is unaware of the change in his appearance) wonders aloud, "Now what's eating THEM? Hmph! You'd think they never saw a rabbit before!" He chews on his carrot as the cartoon irises out.

Allusions
 In the cartoon, Bugs sits down at a piano, places a candelabra upon it, and utters the phrase, "I wish my brother George was here". The reference was to Liberace, who had a brother named George that was also his conductor on TV. It also references Liberace's personal appearances during the 1950s. Liberace's feature film debut Sincerely Yours, also produced by Warner Bros., was released around the same time as this cartoon. You can also hear that quote on Three Little Bops by the piano playing pig.
 The piano piece that Bugs plays is the Minute Waltz (Bugs pronounces "minute" as if to mean tiny) by Chopin, or as Bugs calls him "Choppin'."
 When Bugs first sees Mr. Hyde, he says Ralph Kramden's line to him, "You...are a mental case!"

Home media
The cartoon appears on the Looney Tunes: After Dark Laserdisc. In 2004, this cartoon was restored and released on the Looney Tunes Golden Collection: Volume 2 DVD box set. The Warner Archive Blu-Ray of Dr. Jekyll & Mr. Hyde includes an upscaled version of the Golden Collection master. You can play Hyde Bugs in the Looney Tunes: Acme Arsenal video game.

See also
 Looney Tunes and Merrie Melodies filmography (1950–1959)
 List of Bugs Bunny cartoons

References

External links
 
 

1955 films
1955 animated films
1955 short films
Short films directed by Friz Freleng
Looney Tunes shorts
Warner Bros. Cartoons animated short films
Dr. Jekyll and Mr. Hyde films
Films scored by Carl Stalling
Bugs Bunny films
1950s Warner Bros. animated short films
1950s English-language films